The Oklahoma Council of Public Affairs (OCPA) is a conservative, state-based think tank in Oklahoma, US.

Founding, mission, and leadership
Oklahoma Council of Public Affairs (OCPA) was founded in 1993 as a public policy research organization focused primarily on state-level issues. The founders, led by Dr. David Brown, envisioned an organization that was capable of affecting the state’s public policy similar to national level think tanks. Since its founding OCPA has conducted research and analysis of public issues in Oklahoma from a perspective of limited government, individual liberty and a free-market economy.

The group was founded following a meeting arranged by Tony Wyman, a Republican political staffer working in the Bill Price 5th District congressional primary campaign and the George H.W. Bush re-election campaign, who brought a representative from(https://taxrelief.org/) to meet with local business and political leaders in the board room of Phillips Petroleum Company in Bartlesville, Oklahoma, in 1992.   

OCPA headquarters is near the Oklahoma State Capitol in Oklahoma City. Jonathan Small serves as the organization's president.

A Ten Commandments outdoor monument tablet was installed at OCPA headquarters in 2015. The monument had been removed from the Oklahoma State Capitol as a reaction to an activist group's attempt to install a Satanic monument alongside the tablet.

See also

 State Policy Network

References

External links
 Official website

Politics of Oklahoma
Organizations based in Oklahoma
1993 establishments in Oklahoma
Think tanks established in 1993
Conservative organizations in the United States